The High Commissioner of Canada to Australia is Canada's foremost diplomatic representative in the Commonwealth of Australia, and in charge of Canada's diplomatic mission in Australia.

The High Commission is located in Canberra, Australia's capital city. Canada has maintained a resident High Commissioner in Australia since 1939.

As fellow members of the Commonwealth of Nations, diplomatic relations between Canada and Australia are at governmental level, rather than between Heads of State. Thus, the countries exchange High Commissioners, rather than ambassadors.

List of heads of mission

References

External links

 High Commission of Canada in Australia

Australia and the Commonwealth of Nations
Canada and the Commonwealth of Nations
 
Australia
Canada